Sonal Sehgal (born 13 July 1981) is an Indian actress who debuted on the silver screen with the critically acclaimed Aashayein (film) directed by the national award-winning director Nagesh Kukunoor where she was cast opposite John Abraham. She went on to play lead roles in films like Future to bright hai ji (2012), Mantostaan (2017), and Lihaaf (2019).

Personal life 

She married Naresh Kamath in 2011. Before pursuing an acting career, Sehgal assisted ad filmmaker and director Pradeep Sarkar who made his film debut with Parineeta. She also worked as a copywriter for leading advertising agencies in Delhi. The actress turned into a producer with Indo-Latvian sci-fi thriller Manny in which she played a lead role opposite Russian actor Jurijs Dyakonovs.

Career

Films 

Aashayein was directed by the national award-winning director Nagesh Kukunoor. Sehgal was cast opposite John Abraham, who played the dying protagonist. Sehgal played the pillar of strength and the only ray of hope in the dying man's life. Radio is a drama, featuring a complex relationship between a man, his ex-wife (played by Sehgal), and his current girlfriend.

Future to bright hai ji, although a disappointment at the box office, earned great reviews. It is a comedy about a couple from a small town (played by Aamir Bashir and Sonal Sehgal) who come to Mumbai to try their luck in Bollywood. It is a hilarious account of their trials and tribulations. Sehgal penned the lyrics of the title song of the same film. In Rahat Kazmi's Mantostaan, based on the works of celebrated writer Saadat Hasan Manto, she played the leading role.

Sonal plays the lead role in and has also co written the screenplay of "Lihaaf", along with director Rahat Kazmi. The film based on Ismat Chugtai's story of the same name, is produced by Oscar Winner Marc Baschet.

Television 
She began her career with theatre and television. She had a pivotal role in the celebrated theater scriptwriter/director Mahesh Dattani's play Mad about Money. She also had lead roles in the television serials Saara Akaash and Hotel Kingston, in which she played diverse characters. These programs aired back-to-back from 2005 to 2007. In Saara Akash, she played an undercover spy on the Indian Air force base who lost her heart to a pilot. The audience loved to hate her and then fell in love with her. In Hotel Kingston, she played a spoiled brat who inherited her father's hotel and managed it incompetently. The character was a brat with a golden heart who the audience adored.

Filmography

Films

Television

Music 
Sonal Sehgal worked on many Hindi and Punjabi private albums from 2001 to 2003. Hit songs include Chadi Jawani with Jassy B, Ghungat by Pankaj Udhas, Botla Sarab Diyan with Bally Sagoo, Harbhajan Maan and many more.

Sonal has written lyrics for the title track of the film Future to Bright Hai ji (2012). She also wrote the lyrics of the 2018 single "Saawariya", composed by Naresh Kamath and sung by Shilpa Rao.

Books
 The Day That Nothing Happened (2018), a fictional story about people who travel to a 'Multiverse'

References

External links

 
 

Indian television actresses
Actresses from Chandigarh
Living people
1981 births